These were the individual stages of the 2009 Tour de France, with Stage 12 on 16 July and Stage 21 on 26 July.

Stages
 s.t. indicates that the rider crossed the finish line in the same group as the one receiving the time above him, and was therefore credited with the same finishing time.

Stage 12
16 July 2009 – Tonnerre to Vittel, 200 km

This was considered a flat stage, but had six hills that contributed points towards the climbers' competition.  After some unsuccessful attempts at breakaways early in the stage, after 64 km Laurent Lefèvre started a breakaway. He was followed by the leader in the polka dot jersey category, Egoi Martínez, and the third-placed rider in that category, Franco Pellizotti, along with Sylvain Calzati, Markus Fothen, and Rémi Pauriol. Ten km later, they were joined by Nicki Sørensen.

The peloton was led by Nocentini's  team, with no effort made by the teams of the sprinters to chase down the escape group.  The lead held by the escape group increased over the last 40 km, from less than four minutes to over six.  With 22 km remaining, Sørensen launched an attack with only Calzati joining him. At 5.5 km, he again attacked, dropping Calzati and remaining clear to win the stage by 48 seconds.

Mark Cavendish had said that he was interested in earning stage wins rather than pursuing the points jersey. However, he increased his lead in that competition by taking points at the first intermediate sprint of the day and leading the peloton home.

Potential GC contenders Levi Leipheimer and Cadel Evans were involved in a fall in the closing stages of the race, but as the incident was within the last 3 km they were credited with the same time as the rest of the peloton. But before stage 13, Leipheimer would abandon the race due to a broken wrist.

Stage 13
17 July 2009 – Vittel to Colmar, 200 km

This was a medium-mountain stage, with five categorized climbs, including one first category mountain, the Col du Platzerwasel. Christophe Moreau launched an attack after just 3 km, and was joined by Juan Manuel Gárate, Jens Voigt, Rigoberto Urán, Heinrich Haussler, Sylvain Chavanel and Rubén Pérez.  These last three moved away from the rest of the escape on the descent from the first climb, and while the rest of the escapees returned to the peloton, the lead trio gained an advantage of 9'10" on the second climb.  Pérez was dropped on the climb of the day's highest mountain, and Haussler dropped Chavanel on its descent, and rode the last 50 km alone to win the stage more than 6½ minutes ahead of the peloton.  A late attack by Amets Txurruka and Brice Feillu allowed the former to gain several minutes on the peloton, but Feillu, only 4'26" behind the yellow jersey at the start of the day failed to keep pace with his fellow escaper, and once it was clear that he would not make a serious challenge to the overall leadership, the peloton eased its chase, and riders who had become detached from the elite group were able to rejoin the peloton, including Thor Hushovd who took enough points in the final placings to regain the green jersey.  Franco Pellizotti took points on three of the five climbs, thus gaining enough points to assume leadership of the King of the Mountains classification. Simon Špilak finished the stage alone more than ¾ hour behind Haussler, but the Tour officials acknowledged that he had been delayed by errors in re-opening the roads to the public earlier than should have been done, and that this contributed to his late finish, and so he was not eliminated. Óscar Freire and Julian Dean were both hit by pellets fired from an air gun during the stage, but were able to continue on the Tour.

Stage 14
18 July 2009 – Colmar to Besançon, 199 km

This was a relatively flat stage, with a category 3 climb either side of the halfway point.  A woman was killed and two other spectators injured when they were hit by a police motorcycle in Wittelsheim, the first fatality connected to the Tour since 2002.

A fourteen man break, initiated after 14 km, by Martijn Maaskant dominated the day's racing. The group was reduced to 12 as Mark Cavendish made a tactical decision to return to the peloton, and Jens Voigt had a puncture inefficiently repaired by the neutral service vehicle, but otherwise remained clear, with a lead that reached nearly nine minutes. Among the escapees were George Hincapie, who started the day in 28th place, 5'25" behind the leader, and Christophe Le Mével, two places and 38 seconds further back. As it became clear that day's winner would come from among the group, there were several attacks, of which the effort by Sergei Ivanov with 11 km remaining was decisive. He won the stage by 16 seconds, with the peloton recovering enough time to preserve Nocentini's tenure of the yellow jersey by 5 seconds. It was suggested that Garmin's role in preventing Hincapie gaining the overall lead was influenced by their rivalry with his , but this was denied.

Green jersey rivals Mark Cavendish and Thor Hushovd were in a hotly contested sprint at the head of the peloton, and although Cavendish finished ahead, he was later relegated to the last position in the peloton for "irregular sprinting", specifically maneuvering Hushovd toward a barricade in the final 300 meters, with a net loss of 14 points to his Norwegian rival.

Stage 15

19 July 2009 – Pontarlier to Verbier (Switzerland), 207 km

The Tour reached the Alps, with four third category climbs in the first half of the stage, and the second half featuring the second category climb on the Col des Mosses (1,445 m elevation) and the race's second mountaintop finish at Verbier in Switzerland, at about the same elevation. Tom Boonen did not start the stage, and Vladimir Efimkin, who started in the top 20 overall, withdrew about halfway through the stage. Several early attacks failed to get any lasting gap ahead of the peloton, although they did allow Franco Pellizotti to increase his lead in the climbers' competition. The longest lasting escape of the day took place after 40 km, and had a number of changes of personnel before it settled to a body of ten riders, including Mikel Astarloza who was 18th overall, 3'02" behind the leader, at the beginning of the day, and who was "virtual leader" until the last 40 km. The breakaway was overhauled by most of the contenders for a high overall placing, with Denis Menchov the most notable absentee from the selection, Simon Špilak having survived for longest. As on the climb to Arcalis, Alberto Contador made a telling attack on the elite group, this time with 6 km remaining, and only Andy Schleck went in pursuit. Contador continued to increase his lead all the way to the line, winning both the stage and the yellow jersey. Andy Schleck came in second and took over the white jersey from Tony Martin after 13 stages.

Rest day
20 July 2009 – Verbier (Switzerland)

The second rest day took place where the previous day's stage ended.

Stage 16
21 July 2009 – Martigny (Switzerland) to Bourg-Saint-Maurice, 160 km

The return to racing after the second rest day featured two long climbs and their descents: the Col du Grand-Saint-Bernard, the highest point in this year's Tour at 2,473 meters, and the Col du Petit Saint-Bernard, at which stage the race returned to France.  An early break initiated by Maxime Bouet grew to 26 members, and mountains classifications challengers Franco Pellizotti and Egoi Martínez, along with Vladimir Karpets moved clear of the group as they approached the first climb.  Martínez could not stay with the other two escapees, and Pellizotti took maximum points over the pass. In the long flat passage between both passes, the two leaders were caught by the large group and together started the last climb. Just before the top of this second climb, Pellizotti and Jurgen Van den Broeck who had been leading the climb, were joined by Mikel Astarloza and Amaël Moinard. Four further escapees also remained ahead of the favourites, but among that group an attack by Andy Schleck caused an elite group in which he was joined by his brother Fränk Schleck, Alberto Contador, Bradley Wiggins, Vincenzo Nibali and Andreas Klöden.  Lance Armstrong led a response, and there was no lasting split among the GC contenders apart from Cadel Evans, who failed to stay with the yellow jersey group.  Pellizotti again led over the top of the climb, and in the approach to the finishing town, Astarloza broke clear with 2 km remaining to win the stage, as the four chasers caught the remnants of the lead group. Jens Voigt fell hard while descending the col du Petit-Saint-Bernard with the group of the yellow jersey, he fractured his right cheekbone and suffered a concussion, and had to abandon the Tour. However, five days after the Tour finished the UCI announced that the initial stage winner Mikel Astarloza tested positive for EPO in an out-of-competition test on June 26, eight days before the race started. Astarloza was removed from the results, and the stage win transferred to Sandy Casar.

Stage 17
22 July 2009 – Bourg-Saint-Maurice to Le Grand-Bornand, 169 km

This stage had five categorized climbs on it, including four category 1 climbs, and was regarded the queen stage of this year's Tour. The first three quarters of the stage were dominated by the consolidation of the lead in both the climbers' and sprinters' competitions. A group of 20, led by Franco Pellizotti, crossed the first hill, Cormet de Roselend, before being closed down and passed by green jersey holder, Thor Hushovd. Pellizotti was the first of the following group over the hills, gaining maximum of the remaining climber's points. On the second to last mountain, the Col de Romme, a series of attacks by Andy and Fränk Schleck overhauled the breakaway group, and left the Luxembourgian brothers in a lead group with yellow jersey holder Alberto Contador and his Astana team-mate Andreas Klöden. An attempted breakaway by Contador succeeded only in dropping Klöden, and the leading trio continued to extend their lead over Col de la Colombière to the finish line, where the older Schleck brother, Fränk, was allowed to take the stage win. Lance Armstrong and Vincenzo Nibali overtook Klöden in the closing kilometre, finishing more than two minutes behind the first three finishers, who took the top three places in the overall classification.

Stage 18
23 July 2009 – Annecy, 40 km (ITT)

The final time trial was held earlier in the race than is usual, and was not, as it had been for many years previously, the last stage which is competitive in terms of the overall classification.  It followed a 40.5 km route around Lake Annecy, on a course that was mainly flat. A 270 m hill approximately ¾ around the course of 5% gradient would assist strong climbers in finishing closer to the typical TT specialists.

The riders set off in reverse order of their standing in the general classification, and the 19th rider to start, Mikhail Ignatiev set fastest times at all the intermediate checkpoints, and at the finish, that stood until Olympic time trial champion Fabian Cancellara, starting 58 riders later, bettered his times at the last checkpoint and, more importantly, at the finish line.  Cancellara's finishing time, and Ignatiev's intermediate times were unchallenged until the last few riders were on the course, by which time there had been a rain shower and the wind speed had increased.  Both Bradley Wiggins and Alberto Contador beat Cancellara's times at the top of the climb, and the earlier checkpoints, but lost time relative to the Swiss rider over the last part of the course.  Wiggins lost 55 seconds to Cancellara in the last 12 km, and ended sixth on the stage, while Contador lost 49 seconds to him over the same distance, but still retained a three second advantage to win the stage.

Andy Schleck conceded 1'45" to Contador in coming 21st on the stage, but retained his second place overall, while Lance Armstrong, 16th on the stage, moved up to third overall, with an 11 second advantage over Wiggins.

Stage 19
24 July 2009 – Bourgoin-Jallieu to Aubenas, 195 km

This was a largely flat stage, but featured a category 2 climb 16 km from the finish. This smaller group stayed away from a chase group of about 40 riders that included all but one of the top 20 in the general classification, and some of the top sprinters in the race, for a further 35 km, but were caught before the final climb started in earnest. A split in the group as it crossed the line meant that Lance Armstrong gained four seconds over the rest of the contenders for a place on the final podium in Paris.

Stage 20
25 July 2009 – Montélimar to Mont Ventoux, 167 km

This was the first time the Tour had had a mountain stage on its second-to-last day. The early stages, which included four categorised climbs, saw a group of 16 riders build a lead in excess of 10'30" before  started to limit their gains. Juan Manuel Gárate triggered the disintegration of the lead group by attacking on the lower slopes, with only Tony Martin able to stay with him for long. The yellow jersey group passed many of the members of the earlier escape as it climbed, but the seven riders who had any ambition of comprising the top three in Paris remained together for most of the climb. Andy Schleck attempted a number of attacks, but as they neither allowed him to escape from Alberto Contador, nor assisted Fränk Schleck to move clear of Lance Armstrong in his ambition to gain third place overall, he did not persist with them. Franco Pellizotti, who already had an unassailable lead in the King of the Mountains category, caught and passed the yellow jersey group in pursuit of Martin and Gárate. Among the elite group, which had been joined by Roman Kreuziger in a bid to get into the top ten in general classification, the first to lose contact was Andreas Klöden, and with 2 km remaining Bradley Wiggins became detached from the group. Gárate attacked Martin twice in the closing stages, and although the German was able to catch-up twice, the Spaniard moved clear in the last 200m to win the stage. Pellizotti was caught by the yellow jersey group in the last 200m, and although Armstrong increased his lead over Wiggins, Fränk Schleck's margin over the British rider at the line was not enough to overtake him for fourth place overall.

Stage 21
26 July 2009 – Montereau-Fault-Yonne to Paris Champs-Élysées, 160 km

The 2009 Tour ended, as it had for the previous 34 years, on the Champs-Élysées.  The pace was casual in the early part of the stage, marked more by photo opportunities for the category leaders, but the pace increased once the race reached central Paris.  On the first of seven circuits of the Champs-Élysées, a seven rider escape moved clear, consisting of Jussi Veikkanen, Arnaud Coyot, Samuel Dumoulin, Alexandre Pichot, Carlos Barredo, Fabian Wegmann and Fumiyuki Beppu.  The breakaway nullified the intermediate sprints as part of the only unresolved contest, the green jersey category.  The last three escapees, Veikkanen, Wegmann and Beppu, were caught shortly after the start of the last circuit.  Although the  team attempted to get ahead of the  lead out, Mark Cavendish won the sprint, his sixth stage of the Tour, with several metres to spare, with his lead-out man Mark Renshaw second.  Thor Hushovd, by finishing sixth, took enough points to secure the points competition, and the other riders finished in the group to confirm their positions and awards.

References

2 To Stage 21, 2009 Tour De France
Tour de France
Tour de France
Tour de France stages